Archingeayia is an extinct genus of sawfish-like shark from the Cretaceous period. The name is derived from the type locale of the type species: Archingeay−Les Nouillers, France. This genus is known currently by isolated oral teeth alone from a singular species, A. sistaci. The specific epithet honors geologist Paul Sistac. This species was described from the lower Cenomanian of France.

References

Sclerorhynchidae
Prehistoric cartilaginous fish genera